"Chapter 6: The Prisoner" is the sixth episode of the first season of the American streaming television series The Mandalorian. It was written by Rick Famuyiwa and Christopher Yost, directed by Famuyiwa, and released on Disney+ on December 13, 2019. The episode stars Pedro Pascal as The Mandalorian, a lone bounty hunter on the run who gets recruited by some of his former colleagues. The episode received a Primetime Emmy Awards nomination.

Plot 
The Mandalorian contacts his old friend Ran. Ran has hired a crew consisting of ex-Imperial sharpshooter Migs Mayfeld, the Devaronian strongman Burg, the droid pilot Zero, and the knife-wielding Twi'lek woman Xi'an to rescue her brother Qin, a prisoner of the New Republic. Upon arrival on the prison ship, they fight through security droids and make it to the control room where an inadvertent escalation causes a New Republic soldier to trigger a beacon alerting the New Republic. The crew rescues Qin but double-crosses the Mandalorian.

The Mandalorian escapes, isolates, and defeats each crew member, then captures Qin, whom he delivers to Ran in exchange for the money. Ran attempts to send a gunship after the Mandalorian to kill him, but the New Republic beacon had been placed on Qin, leading a trio of X-wing fighters to Ran's station. The X-wings open fire on the hangar. Lastly, Mayfeld, Burg, and Xi'an are shown in a cell on the prison transport, nursing their wounds, having been spared.

Production

Development 
The episode was directed by Rick Famuyiwa and scripted by Famuyiwa and Christopher Yost from a story by Yost.

Casting 
Footage shown at Star Wars Celebration in April 2019 revealed that Mark Boone Junior and Bill Burr were in the series, playing Ran Malk and Mayfeld, respectively. Bill Burr is not a fan of Star Wars, but he ran into Jon Favreau at a birthday party, and was offered a role in The Mandalorian. Other co-starring actors cast for this episode include Natalia Tena as Xi'an, Clancy Brown as Burg, Richard Ayoade as the voice of Q9-0 "Zero", and Ismael Cruz Córdova as Qin. Carl Weathers also co-stars as Greef Karga.

Additional guest-starring actors cast for this episode include Matt Lanter as Davan and directors Dave Filoni, Rick Famuyiwa, and Deborah Chow as X-wing pilots Trapper Wolf, Jib Dodger, and Sash Ketter. Lanter had previously voiced Anakin Skywalker in Star Wars: The Clone Wars and Star Wars Rebels. Brendan Wayne and Lateef Crowder are credited as stunt doubles for The Mandalorian. Barry Lowin is credited as an additional double for The Mandalorian, while Chris Bartlett is credited as a performance artist for Q9-0. Chad Bennett, Katherine O'Donovan, and Justin Anthony Williams are credited as stunt doubles for Migs Mayfeld, Xi'an, and Burg, respectively. "The Child" was performed by various puppeteers.

Music 
Ludwig Göransson composed the musical score for the episode. The soundtrack album for the episode was released on December 13, 2019.

Reception

Critical response
On Rotten Tomatoes, the episode holds an approval rating of 84% with an average rating of 7.6/10, based on 31 reviews. The website's critics consensus reads, "The Prisoner opts for more world-of-the-week action, providing many fun moments but little forward momentum."

In a positive review, Alan Sepinwall, of the Rolling Stone, felt that "like most of the series to this point, 'The Prisoner' isn't so much deep as it is fun. And that continues to work well enough." 
Keith Phipps of New York Magazine gave the episode 4 out 5 and wrote: "Anyone who's felt like The Mandalorian hasn't featured enough dirtbags so far should have no complaints after this episode." Phipps compared the episode to the film Vera Cruz (1954). Joe Skrebels at IGN gave it 7.6 out of 10 and wrote: "It's simple, effective, and offers us a wildly different set-up to other, more introspective episodes of the show because, of course, every heist needs a crew." Katie Rife of The A.V. Club enjoyed the episode but was frustrated by the lack of answers, saying "Personally, I don't mind the X-Files-esque way The Mandalorian'''s first season has toggled between standalone episodes and a larger story arc so much, as long as the side adventures are exciting and full of cool aliens and planets."

In a negative review, Tyler Hersko, of IndieWire, stated that "the last three episodes of The Mandalorian have been entirely interchangeable, and there's been zero plot developments to speak of since the titular protagonist escaped the Bounty Hunter's Guild with Baby Yoda in tow in Episode 3."

Awards

The episode was nominated for the Primetime Emmy Award for Outstanding Prosthetic Makeup for a Series, Limited Series, Movie or Special. It lost to the Star Trek: Picard'' episode "Stardust City Rag".

References

External links 
 
 

2019 American television episodes
Television episodes set in prisons
Television shows directed by Rick Famuyiwa
The Mandalorian episodes